The First European Air Traffic Controller Selection Test (FEAST) is a tool that helps Air Navigation Service Providers (ANSPs) identify the most suitable candidates for the job of air traffic controllers. FEAST was designed by and made available by (EUROCONTROL), the European Organisation for the Safety of Air Navigation. It is used by 44 organisations, including civil and military European Air Navigation Service Providers and certified ATC aviation training academies and universities.

Structure
The FEAST test package consists of 3 modules:
 FEAST I – a set of cognitive tests and an English language test
 FEAST II – two ATC work sample tests
 FEAST III – a personality questionnaire
Tests are administered in a standardized way, and all results are scored by computer. This is done to ensure the objectivity of the process. The first phase of FEAST aims at measuring basic skills and abilities in decision-making, logical reasoning, visual perception, attention, multi-tasking, and spatial orientation. This phase also includes a test on English language knowledge. All parts of the FEAST I consist of multiple choice questions. Once the candidate has successfully passed the FEAST I tests, they may be invited to attend a second round of testing. In this second phase they do one or two work sample tests:
 the FEAST Dynamic ATC Radar test (FEAST DART)
 and possibly the FEAST Multipass test
These tests are aimed at measuring the multi-tasking abilities. The tests are more complex and require the candidates to perform a number of different tasks at the same time. The third phase of FEAST consists of the assessment of personality traits and behavioral tendencies. The exact content of this phase differs among organizations that use FEAST.

Content
This is not based on real FEAST tests, it's based in a programme (Skytest) which is not approved by Eurocontrol.  

Nearly all parts of the FEAST test consist of multiple choice questions. The test contains questions related to:

In a coordinate system, aircraft are represented as dots. Horizontally, lines are called A, B, C, D, and E and vertically, 1, 2, 3, 4, and 5. For example, the dot C3 is where the lines C and 3 cross. Each square has a length of 10. The directions are depicted in a circle and are represented in degrees. Applicants are to estimate the distance between an aircraft and a given dot, as well as the new heading a plane must face turning to the left or to the right to get to a certain given point. In the coordinate system, many dots and planes can be seen, but the relevant ones must be found quickly.
Reflex action test: In the so-called ball on the wall test, applicants must push a button when 2 moving objects (a ball and a line or wall) collide. Eventually the screen is divided into 2 parts, requiring concentration on 2 collisions. Finally, 4 parts are simultaneously seen, and one's attention must be on all of them. Sometimes the balls return and collide again. All of the images vary in speed.
In the English section (which some air traffic control organisations do not see as important, compared with other features of the FEAST test) there are 3 sections:
The 1st part is to listen to a sentence, which is interrupted with a beep-tone. Applicants then choose the word (from the choice offered) which is the closest in meaning to the sentence.
The 2nd part is the “whole comprehension” of English. Candidates must read 2 texts with 2 different topics. The first text deals with the relationship between bosses and employees within a firm, particularly with the question how to deal with errors, made by the employees and how to distinguish between "punishable" and "non punishable" errors, respectively "avoidable" and "non avoidable" errors and how to cope with them by maintaining a good working atmosphere. The second text is about the relationship between companies and media, particularly how to maintain the companies´ public reputation through a media council.
Finally at the 3rd part, one must listen to a telephone conversation, which is about booking a train ticket: The scheduling, particularly the times and the prices of the ticket are often changed and in progress of the conversation, one must remember all data (cancelled as well as topical scheduling times, prices, and so on).
In the landing instructions, applicants have to guide some aircraft to the ground. Some of the displayed runways are closed. The 2 numbers to the right of the aircraft represent the identification number of the aircraft (on the top) and its speed (on the bottom). The arrow on the runway means that aircraft must land from this direction. Via some dots, which the aircraft has to pass, applicants have some choices to direct the aircraft down to the runway. The rules are: slower aircraft must give way to faster aircraft; no overflying of any runway; and any crossing of the route of any other aircraft is forbidden. However, sometimes a message occurs that selected aircraft have a higher priority, even if they are slow in their speed; or that some aircraft above a certain speed are not allowed to land; or that a certain aircraft must land immediately. Very often, one also must face restricted areas, into which no plane is allowed to enter. There is a short time limit to complete this exercise.
In a reaction test, applicants have to sort some shapes. On the bottom part of the screen is a small keyboard, on which there are some shapes (triangle, circle, diamond, square, etc.). Suddenly a shape appears on the top part of the screen. The applicant is given approximately 1–2 seconds to push the button corresponding to the shape displayed. Sometimes an instruction appears to sort particular shapes in another way (for example, if you see a triangle, sort it as a square). Sometimes the shapes must be sorted by their colour, independent of the shape itself. Again, there are also sometimes instructions to sort it differently (for example, all red circles must be sorted as blue objects). Very often beside the displayed shape on the top part of the screen, another shape can be seen. If both shapes are the same, applicants must press the “same” button, irrespective of the colour or the figure. This "same" command overrules all other instructions regarding sorting of the shapes. The 2nd part of this is the same as the 1st, but instead using numbers rather than shapes. For example, when the number 48 is displayed, it must be sorted into one category - this would be sorted into “0-250”. However, this exercise also develops as time passes; for example, if the sum of the digits of the number displayed is greater than 10, or if a particular digit appears twice in the given number, it must be sorted as if it were in the category “250-500”, and so forth.
In the cube test, the applicant's spatial awareness is tested. A net of a cube is shown which must be mentally constructed and compared with 2 cubes. All in all there are 4 cubes, which are always unfolded differently and the candidate knows when a new cube is given in the exercise. Most of the time, one of the cubes corresponds to the net of the cube shown; sometimes none of the 2 options do. There are 25 minutes for 36 cubes. This test is particularly designed to test the left-right coordination, because the nets/areas of the shown cube normally consist of white, orange and blue areas, but especially they consist of arrows, which show into various directions. As one puts the model together, one must particularly decide into which direction the arrows of the constructed cube show. Here ends the first part of the test, if national air traffic control organisations split it into two parts (see above).
In the final part of the test, local and opposite conflicts on air strips are presented. This is the so-called “flight strip test” or "strip management display" named SDM. During the test, a clock is running in the corner of the screen. The rest of the screen is divided into columns, one for the airspace at each hypothetical airport in the test. At each airport is a collection of strips. These need to be sorted in order of time. Simultaneously, you need to remove strips which have now expired and identify conflicts between both flights coming in and out of the airport and flights in the airport's airspace. While doing this, new strips are continuously added to the display.
In 2011 SDM was replaced by a brand new test: DART (Dynamic ATC Radar Test). The DART test requires applicants to guide aircraft safely and efficiently through a system of checkpoints taking certain traffic constraints into consideration: The DART test requires applicants to guide 3 airplanes safely and efficiently through a system of 4 checkpoints (A,B,C,D), taking certain traffic constraints into consideration: All 3 planes are only allowed to fly in an altitude of either 100, 200, or 300. First without any other planes, then with air traffic of various other planes, one does not have control over (and which are normally always on collision course) and finally, one must additionally, simultaneously do some mental arithmetic: You are listening to a sequence of letters and digits. Whenever 2 digits are to be heard, one must add them together: For example, "AT3QSK7TBV8PH4" requires at first an addition of "3+7" and then as soon as you hear the digit 8, an addition of "7+8" and then "8+4"; so, in other words, to remember the last digit of the last addition and to add it with the next coming digit. The top priority is, of course, to avoid conflicts or collisions between the planes, but also to give possibly very few commands - as fewest as it is possible. Planes on the screen respond to the given instructions with a certain time delay. You can find more information by accessing the link in the External Links section.

Some air traffic control organisations now add additional tests, for example a special reaction test or detection of a figure (a house) out of a muddle of lines.

Preparation for FEAST
The tests are demanding in terms of concentration. Resilience and perseverance are required. Therefore, EUROCONTROL advises that the candidates should only attend the testing in a good physical and mental condition. EUROCONTROL discourages specific test preparation; however, there are some general areas in which the candidates can prepare themselves: 
In case of non-native speakers of English, applicants can prepare by improving their general level of English proficiency.
Applicants may familiarize themselves with basic aviation concepts and terminology (although no ATC background knowledge is required to perform FEAST). 
Candidates could look for information about Air Traffic Control (ATC) and the job of an Air Traffic Controller to familiarise themselves with the challenges and demands of the job.
FEAST tests are designed for beginners with no background in ATC. The tests instructions are very detailed and ensure that everything is explained before the tests start.

Result

A result is given directly after the test, or via a letter, e-mail or phone call. These results are computed by the central computer of Eurocontrol in Brussels (each candidate is connected with this computer via internet). The score required to proceed to the next round of selection differs from one air traffic control organisation to another. If a candidate has already successfully participated in a FEAST test, Eurocontrol offers a special certificate for trying it again elsewhere. Each company has a different opinion of whether an applicant is allowed to try the test again or not. According to the rules of Eurocontrol, unsuccessful applicants must wait 2 years before a second attempt.

Criticism and commendation of the FEAST test

Although 44 member states of Eurocontrol use the FEAST test, it is not as popular elsewhere. The reason for this is that, until January 2015, the test could only be provided to ANSPs and ATC training academies in Eurocontrol member states. A particular criticism of the FEAST test refers to the English part of the FEAST test: some national air traffic control organisations add (after a successful FEAST test) an oral English test (a conversation with a native English speaking air traffic controller). The results of this oral English test are equivalent to the so-called "ICAO Level 4 English Knowledge Requirement"[1], which every pilot and air traffic controller must have. People who obtain relatively low scores in the English part of the FEAST test often pass this second English test easily and one can doubt how objective the English part of the FEAST test actually is.

On the other hand, the FEAST test is seen to be a very fair test: if this test is taken directly at Eurocontrol, all travel expenses and costs of hotels are reimbursed, as far as the applicant's residence is out of an area of 50 km from the Maastricht upper area control centre. Everyone, especially those of poorer member-countries of Eurocontrol, has a fair and realistic chance. Excessively so, no specific knowledge of mathematics or physics are required. Psychological "pre-selections" do not exist either. Applicants from all member countries of Eurocontrol are encouraged to participate and since the systems of education of each of the member states are rather different, Eurocontrol sets the priority of the FEAST test on basic skills. Additionally, unlike some other national air traffic control organisations, multiple attempts are possible.

References

External links
http://www.eurocontrol.int/services/feast
http://feast-info.eurocontrol.int/

Air traffic control
Standardized tests
Air traffic control in Europe